Vasile Seredai (born 22 December 1933) is a Romanian former footballer who played as a forward.

International career
Vasile Seredai made his debut for Romania's national team in a friendly against Poland while playing in the second league for Tractorul Brașov. He played a total of four friendly games and scored three goals, two against Turkey and one against Morocco.

Honours
Rapid București
Cupa Primăverii: 1957

Notes

References

External links

Vasile Seredai at Labtof.ro

1933 births
Living people
Romanian footballers
Romania international footballers
Association football forwards
Liga I players
Liga II players
FC Rapid București players
FC Brașov (1936) players
People from Brașov